Otakar Jandera (9 January 1898 – 25 March 1977) was a Czech hurdler. He competed in the 110 metres hurdles at the 1924 Summer Olympics and the 1928 Summer Olympics.

References

External links
 

1898 births
1977 deaths
Athletes (track and field) at the 1924 Summer Olympics
Athletes (track and field) at the 1928 Summer Olympics
Czech male hurdlers
Czechoslovak male hurdlers
Olympic athletes of Czechoslovakia
Sportspeople from Kraków